Natural method may refer to:

 Direct method (education), a language teaching method established around 1900
 Natural method ("la méthode naturelle"), a system of physical education created by Georges Hébert

See also 
 Natural Method of Teaching, a 1683 combined English and Latin grammar written by Samuel Hoadly
 Natural family planning, the family planning methods approved by the Roman Catholic Church
 Naturopathy, a form of alternative medicine
 Natural approach, a language teaching method developed in the late 1970s and early 1980s